SS John A. Campbell was a Liberty ship built in the United States during World War II. She was named after John A. Campbell, an Associate Justice of the Supreme Court of the United States and Peace Commissioner for the Confederate States of America.

Construction
John A. Campbell was laid down on 13 April 1943, under a Maritime Commission (MARCOM) contract, MC hull 1496, by J.A. Jones Construction, Brunswick, Georgia; sponsored by Mrs. Frank Dowd, and launched on 14 August 1943.

History
She was allocated to Moore-McCormack Lines, Inc., on 31 August 1943. On 21 October 1947, she was laid up in the National Defense Reserve Fleet in Astoria, Oregon. On 9 June 1954, she was withdrawn from the fleet to be loaded with grain under the "Grain Program 1954"; she returned loaded with grain on 23 June 1954. She was again withdrawn from the fleet on 8 October 1957 to have the grain unloaded; she returned empty on 11 October 1957. On 6 July 1967, she was sold to Universal Salvage and Construction for $51,700, for scrapping; she was delivered on 29 August 1967.

References

Bibliography

 
 
 
 
 

 

Liberty ships
Ships built in Brunswick, Georgia
1943 ships
Astoria Reserve Fleet
Astoria Reserve Fleet Grain Program